The 2012 United States House of Representatives elections in Missouri were held on Tuesday, November 6, 2012 and elected the eight U.S. Representatives from the state of Missouri, a loss of one seat following the 2010 United States Census. The elections coincided with the elections of other federal and state offices, including a quadrennial presidential election and an election to the U.S. Senate.

Overview

Redistricting
A new congressional map was passed by the Missouri General Assembly on April 27, 2011. The map was vetoed by Democratic Governor Jay Nixon on April 30, but Nixon's veto was overridden by the General Assembly on May 4, making the plan law. The map effectively eradicated the former 3rd district, which had been represented by Democrat Russ Carnahan since 2005, splitting it between the districts represented by Republicans Blaine Luetkemeyer and Todd Akin and Democrat William Lacy Clay, Jr. The bulk of the old 9th district became the new 3rd district.

District 1

Democrat William Lacy Clay, Jr., who has represented Missouri's 1st congressional district since 2001, will run for re-election.

Democratic primary
Fellow U.S. Representative Russ Carnahan, part of whose district was drawn into the 1st district, challenged Clay in the Democratic primary.

Candidates

Nominee
William Lacy Clay, Jr., incumbent U.S. Representative

Eliminated in primary
Candice Britton
Russ Carnahan, incumbent U.S. Representative for the 3rd district

Declined
Francis Slay, Mayor of St. Louis

Endorsements

Polling

Primary results

Republican primary

Candidates

Nominee
Robyn Hamlin, insurance agent and nominee for this seat in 2010.

Eliminated in primary
Martin Baker, political organizer

Primary results

Libertarian primary

Candidates

Nominee
Robb Cunningham, candidate for this seat in 2010

Primary results

General election

Polling

Clay vs Baker

Carnahan vs Hamlin

Carnahan vs Baker

Results

District 2

Republican Todd Akin, who had represented Missouri's 2nd congressional district since 2001, chose to run for the U.S. Senate rather than seek re-election.

Republican primary

Candidates

Nominee
Ann Wagner, former U.S. Ambassador to Luxembourg and former chair of the Missouri Republican Party

Eliminated in primary
James Baker, businessman
Randy Jotte, emergency room physician and former member of the Webster Groves City Council
John Morris

Declined
Todd Akin, incumbent U.S. Representative
Jane Cunningham, state senator
Joe Smith, former state representative

Withdrawn
Ed Martin, lawyer and nominee for the 3rd district in 2010 (running for state attorney general)

Primary results

Democratic primary

Candidates

Nominee
Glenn Koenen, non-profit executive

Eliminated in primary
Harold Whitfield, attorney
George Weber, realtor
Marshall Works, insurance executive

Declined
Russ Carnahan, incumbent U.S. Representative for the 3rd district

Primary results
Whitfield requested a recount, as the race was separated by less than 1%. By September 13, 2012 the recount was completed and Koenen was declared the winner.

Libertarian primary

Candidates

Nominee
Bill Slantz, businessman

Constitution primary

Candidates

Nominee
Anatol Zorikova, business owner

General election

Endorsements

Results

District 3

Republican Blaine Luetkemeyer ran in the reconfigured 3rd district, which includes most of the 9th district he had represented since 2009.

Republican primary

Candidates

Nominee
Blaine Luetkemeyer, incumbent U.S. Representative

Primary results

Democratic primary

Candidates

Nominee
Eric Mayer, small business owner from Camdenton

Primary results

Libertarian primary

Candidates

Nominee
Steven Wilson, commercial artist

Primary results

Constitution primary

Candidates

Declined
Cynthia Davis, former state representative

General election

Results

District 4

Republican Vicky Hartzler, who represented the 4th district since January 2011, sought re-election. In redistricting, all of Boone, Cooper, Howard, and Randolph counties, and parts of Audrain County, were added to the 4th district; while Cole, Lafayette, Ray, and Saline counties were removed from the district.

Republican primary

Candidates

Nominee
Vicky Hartzler, incumbent U.S. Representative

Eliminated in primary
Bernie Mowinski, U.S. Air Force veteran

Primary results

Democratic primary

Candidates

Nominee
Teresa Hensley, Cass County Prosecuting Attorney

Primary results

Libertarian primary

Candidates

Nominee
Thomas Holbrook

Eliminated in primary
Herschel Young, small business owner

Primary results

Constitution primary

Candidates

Nominee
Greg Cowan, retired Navy lieutenant commander

General election

Endorsements

Results

District 5

Missouri's 5th Congressional district was perhaps the one most complicated by redistricting, and the legal challenges that have ensued. Democratic incumbent Emanuel Cleaver successfully won re-election.

Democratic primary

Candidates

Nominee
Emanuel Cleaver, incumbent U.S. Representative

Primary results

Republican primary
Republican Jerry Nolte, who at first announced his intention to run in the 6th district decided to run in the 5th. Nolte's residence lies on the court-contested border of the two districts.

Candidates

Nominee
Jacob Turk, nominee for this seat in 2006 and 2008 and 2010

Eliminated in primary
Jason Greene
Jerry Nolte, former state representative
Ron Paul Shawd

Primary results

Libertarian primary

Candidates

Nominee
Randall Langkraehr

Primary results

General election

Results

District 6

Due to realignment following the 2010 U.S. Census, the district spanned most of the northern portion of the state, from St. Joseph to Kirksville, and also included most of the state's portion of the Kansas City Metropolitan Area north of the Missouri River. Incumbent Sam Graves, who had represented the district since 2001, ran for reelection.

Republican primary

Candidates

Nominee
Sam Graves, incumbent U.S. Representative

Eliminated in primary
Bob Gough
Christopher Ryan

Withdrawn
Jerry Nolte, former state representative

Primary results

Democratic primary

Candidates

Nominee
Kyle Yarber, teacher

Eliminated in primary
Ronald Harris, truck driver, Air Force veteran and candidate for the 5th district in 2000
Bill Hedge, pastor of St. Francis Baptist Temple
Ted Rights, physician

Primary results

Libertarian primary

Candidates

Nominee
Russ Lee Monchil, Committeeman in Mirabile Township

Primary results

General election

Results

District 7

Republican Billy Long, Democrat Jim Evans, and Libertarian Kevin Craig were the nominees.

Republican primary

Candidates

Nominee
Billy Long, incumbent U.S. Representative

Eliminated in primary
Mike Moon, membership coordinator
Tom Stilson, environmental geochemist

Primary results

Democratic primary

Candidates

Nominee
Jim Evans, retired businessman, teacher, and U.S. Army veteran.

Primary results

Libertarian primary

Candidates

Nominee
Kevin Craig, editor of Vine & Fig Tree

Primary results

General election

Results

District 8

Republican Jo Ann Emerson, who had represented Missouri's 8th congressional district since 1996, was challenged by Democratic nominee Jack Rushin and Libertarian nominee Rick Vandeven.

Republican primary

Candidates

Nominee
Jo Ann Emerson, incumbent U.S. Representative

Eliminated in primary
Bob Parker, rancher and real estate agent

Primary results

Democratic primary

Candidates

Nominee
Jack Rushin, chiropractor

Withdrawn
Todd Mahn, businessman

Primary results

Libertarian primary

Candidates

Nominee
Rick Vandeven

Primary results

General election

Endorsements

Results

See also
 2013 Missouri's 8th congressional district special election
 2012 United States Senate election in Missouri
 2012 Missouri gubernatorial election
 2012 Missouri lieutenant gubernatorial election
 2012 Missouri Attorney General election
 2012 Missouri State Teeasurer election
 1012 Missouri Secretary of State election

References

External links
Elections from the Missouri Secretary of State
Official results (primary)
Official candidate list (general)
United States House of Representatives elections in Missouri, 2012 at Ballotpedia
Missouri U.S. House from OurCampaigns.com
Campaign contributions for U.S. Congressional races in Missouri from OpenSecrets
Outside spending at the Sunlight Foundation
News coverage from The Midwest Democracy Project at The Kansas City Star
 Map of the new congressional districts, published by The Monitor

Missouri
2012
United States House